Kyuragi Dam is a gravity dam located in Saga Prefecture in Japan. The dam is used for water supply, irrigation and power production. The catchment area of the dam is 33.7 km2. The dam impounds about 42  ha of land when full and can store 13600 thousand cubic meters of water. The construction of the dam was started on 1973 and completed in 1986.

References

Dams in Saga Prefecture
1986 establishments in Japan